Preila (Kursenieki: Preiļi or Prēle) is a settlement in the Neringa Municipality, Lithuania.

Infrastructure

The settlement is part of the Preila-Pervalka parish centre. Preila is on located on the main road 167 which runs around the bay, serving as a connection between Nida and Klaipėda. Many of the homes are for rent for summer holidaymakers. Most of the houses are from the 19th century, end of the twentieth century. There is a library which was built in 1954, and a marina which has connections to the nearby Nida. In the southern part of the settlement there is a folk cemetery. The Preila Neringa bike trail goes through the village connecting Nida and Juodkrantė.

History
In 1843–1845, Preila was founded by the inhabitants of the village of Naujieji Nagliai which was buried under shifting sand dunes. In 1849, 84 people lived in Preila. In the same year, a village school moved from Naujieji Nagliai and opened in Preila. In 1907 a new building was built for the school. In the beginning of the 20th century there was already one hotel in Preila.

Although life in Preila was not easy, the number of inhabitants grew: 453 in 1864, 123 in 1871, 133 in 1895, 225 in 1897, 207 in 1905, 238 in 1919 and 250 in 1923. At present, the population of Preila is about 205 people.

In 1933, Preila was recognized as a resort. It was connected by a road to Klaipėda in 1947. In 1961, Preila was administratively incorporated into the Neringa city.

References

Seaside resorts in Lithuania
Villages in Klaipėda County
Neringa Municipality